Saeed Amani was an Iranian bazaari merchant and conservative politician.

He was a senior member of the Islamic Coalition Party, as well as a central council member of Islamic Republican Party.

He was a member of the Supervisory Council of the Guild Affairs and secretary-general of the Union of Islamic Associations of Guilds and Bazaaris. He held the latter office until 2001.

References

External links 
 

1915 births
2002 deaths
Islamic Coalition Party politicians
Central Council of the Islamic Republican Party members
20th-century Iranian businesspeople
Members of the 1st Islamic Consultative Assembly
Members of the 2nd Islamic Consultative Assembly